Pencak silat competitions at the 2019 Southeast Asian Games in Philippines were held at Subic Bay Exhibition and Convention Center from 2 to 5 December 2019.

Schedule
The following is the schedule for the pencak silat competitions. All times are Philippine Standard Time (UTC+8).

Medal table

Medalists

Seni (artistic)

Tanding (match)

Men

Women

References

External links
 

2019 Southeast Asian Games events
2019